Jaktorowo  is a village in the administrative district of Gmina Szamocin, within Chodzież County, Greater Poland Voivodeship, in west-central Poland.

The village has a population of 170.

References

Jaktorowo